Bruce Charles Sudano (born September 26, 1948) is an American singer-songwriter, noted for creating songs for artists such as Michael Jackson, Dolly Parton, Reba McEntire and his late wife, the Grammy Award-winning singer Donna Summer. Sudano is the founder of indie record label, Purple Heart Recording Company.

Early life
Sudano was born in Flatbush, Brooklyn, New York City to Margaret Alessio (1924–2012) and Louis Sudano (1923–2008). At the age of four, Sudano learned to play his first instrument, the accordion. He later taught himself to play piano and guitar. He soon developed a reputation in his community as a talented musician and got his first paid gig at the age of twelve.

By the mid-1960s, Sudano was playing bass guitar in his first band Silent Souls. He spent much of his time rehearsing and was soon playing live shows at popular New York City nightclubs.

While playing at the Cheetah, Sudano met Tommy James of Tommy James and the Shondells. Sudano became the protégé of James, who performed the classic pop song "Mony, Mony."  While working his way through college at St. John's University, where he earned a BA in theatre, Sudano learned to craft songs with James at Allegro Studios.

In 1969, while only 20, Sudano scored his first hit on the music charts with the song "Ball of Fire" which he co-wrote with his mentor.

Music career

Alive N Kickin'
In 1968, Sudano became the keyboard player in the pop rock band Alive N Kickin', which he co-founded with Pepe Cardona. Tommy James wrote a song for the band called "Tighter, Tighter" with Bob King. James also produced the track and sang backing vocals. The song was released on Roulette Records in 1970 and went to No. 7 on the Billboard Hot 100.

Alive N Kickin' did a promotional tour of the United States as the opening act for Chicago and Frank Zappa. However, Sudano left Alive 'N Kickin' in 1972 and moved to Los Angeles, California where wrote and performed folk songs as a solo singer.

In 1973, Sudano returned to Brooklyn where he continued writing and performing but also began rehearsing and playing gigs with Joe "Bean" Esposito, Eddie Hokenson and Louis Hokenson.

Brooklyn Dreams and Donna Summer
In 1977, Sudano, Esposito and Hokenson moved to Los Angeles, formed the band Brooklyn Dreams and signed a recording deal with Millennium Records. That same year, Skip Konte of Three Dog Night produced their self-titled debut. The trio scored a modest hit with the single "Music, Harmony and Rhythm", which they performed on American Bandstand.

On March 13, 1977, Sudano met Donna Summer, who was signed to Casablanca Records. Casablanca was the distributor for Sudano's label Millennium Records. The Brooklyn Dreams and Summer immediately began writing songs together and within a few months Sudano and Summer were dating. In 1978, the band penned "Take It to the Zoo" with Summer for the Thank God It's Friday soundtrack. The same year, the Brooklyn Dreams appeared in the movie American Hot Wax performing as the Planotones, a group created for the movie with long time friend Kenny Vance. They scored a Top 5 hit when they appeared on the single "Heaven Knows" with Esposito and Summer singing a duet. The song peaked at No. 4 on the Billboard Hot 100 chart and became a certified million-selling Gold single in 1979.

In 1979, Brooklyn Dreams and Summer wrote the title track "Bad Girls" for the best selling album of Summers' career Bad Girls. In addition to the title track, Sudano also co-wrote the songs "Lucky" and "On My Honor" with Summer and Harold Faltermeyer as well as "Can't Get to Sleep At Night"  with Bob Conti. He then wrote the song "I'm A Rainbow", which was the title track to Summer's next LP. Unfortunately, it was shelved by Geffen Records and not released until 1996.

When Millennium Records changed their distribution to RCA, the Brooklyn Dreams contract was transferred to Casablanca Records. Under their new recording contract, Brooklyn Dreams recorded three more studio LPs. They released two albums in 1979: Sleepless Nights, produced by Bob Esty, and Joyride produced by Jürgen Koppers, an engineer for Giorgio Moroder. In 1980, they made their fourth and final album Won't Let Go, which they produced themselves. A song from this record, "Hollywood Knights" became the title track for the comedy The Hollywood Knights starring Tony Danza, Michelle Pfeiffer and Fran Drescher. In 2008, "Hollywood Knights" was sampled by Snoop Dogg on his song "Deez Hollywood Nights".

Brooklyn Dreams amicably disbanded in 1980 when Hokensen returned to New York after his mother died. Sudano and Summer continued writing songs together and were married the same year.

Solo artist
Sudano was signed as a solo artist by RCA and released his first record The Fugitive Kind in 1981. It featured a song "Starting Over Again" that Sudano had co-written with his wife Donna Summer about his parents' divorce. In 1980, the song was recorded and released by Dolly Parton on the album Dolly, Dolly, Dolly, and hit No. 1 on the U.S. country charts on May 24, 1980. The song was recorded by Reba McEntire in 1995. Sudano spent two decades managing Summer's career. They toured together, with Sudano playing keyboards and singing background vocals.

In 1984, Sudano wrote "Tell Me I'm Not Dreamin' (Too Good to Be True)" with Michael Omartian. Jermaine Jackson and Michael Jackson recorded the song as a duet for the album Jermaine Jackson. The song was nominated at the 1985 Grammy Awards for Best R&B Performance by a Duo or Group with Vocals. In 1988, the song was covered by Robert Palmer. During the same period, he co-wrote four songs on Summer's She Works Hard for the Money album. One of which was the adult contemporary hit, "Love Has A Mind of Its Own". In 1986, he co-wrote "Closest Thing To Perfect", the title track for the John Travolta, Jamie Lee Curtis movie Perfect.

In 2004, Sudano released a second solo record called Rainy Day Soul and scored three top ten Adult Contemporary hits and earned him the New Music Weekly 2004 Adult Contemporary Artist of the Year award.

Sudano's third solo record Life and the Romantic was released in 2009 and won the New Music Weekly Adult Contemporary Song of the Year award for the track "It's Her Wedding Day" which Sudano wrote about his daughter Brooklyn's marriage. Footage from younger daughter Amanda's wedding to her Johnnyswim bandmate Abner Ramirez was included in the song's music video. Johnnyswim performed with Sudano on the track "Morning Song". The songs "A Glass of Red & the Sunset" and "Beyond Forever" performed well on the smooth jazz charts.
In 2014, after the death of his wife, Sudano released the CD With Angels on a Carousel. Here he delicately and soulfully crafted songs that reflected his experience through this difficult ordeal.

In the fall of 2015, Sudano released a new album, The Burbank Sessions. While playing shows throughout 2014 with his newly formed Candyman Band, he continued writing and incorporated the new material into the sets. Once the dates for the year were concluded, he went into his rehearsal studio and recorded these new songs as he performed them, giving the CD a spontaneous and almost live feel. He followed the release with a run of US shows and an extensive European tour.

In May 2017, Sudano released 21st Century World, a record that features the most culturally and politically charged songwriting of his career. Touching on topics from self-serving government, extremism and demonization, the loss of common sense, the epidemic of single motherhood, and the illusion of social media, to hypocrisy and the meaning of Christianity. A number of videos and live shows followed in support of this record. At the same time, he was steadily immersing himself in the production of a musical based on the life and music of his late wife. In April 2018, Summer: The Donna Summer Musical opened on Broadway. Sudano ended his 2019 tour in the UK, before heading into a two year COVID lockdown. He spent that time writing and recording three albums: Spirals Vol 1, Spirals Vol 2 and Ode to a Nightingale, released in October 2021. He resumed touring in April 2022.

Personal life
Three years after their first meeting, Sudano and singer Donna Summer were married by Pastor Jack Hayford on July 16, 1980, at The Church on the Way in Los Angeles, California. Sudano became the stepfather to Summer's daughter, Natalia Pia Melanie Sommer, also called Mimi (born 1973), from her first marriage to Austrian actor Helmuth Sommer. 

Sudano and Summer then had two daughters together. The couple's first child, Brooklyn, named after the New York City borough Sudano is from, was born in 1981. Their second child, Amanda Grace, was born in 1982. The family settled on a 56-acre ranch in Thousand Oaks, California. In 1991, the family moved to Connecticut and remained there for four years. In 1995, they relocated to Nashville, Tennessee, keeping a second home in Naples, Florida, and later buying a third home in Manhattan, in New York City. On May 17, 2012, Donna Summer Sudano died from lung cancer.

References

External links
 
 Interview With Hit Songwriter Bruce Sudano
 Brooklyn Dreams 2.0: A Conversation with Bruce Sudano and Joe "Bean" Esposito
 Interview With Bruce Sudano Of Alive N Kickin'
  2015 Interview with Bruce Sudano and new album "Brooklyn Dreams" plus career retrospective and anecdotes

1948 births
Living people
American dance musicians
American male singer-songwriters
American multi-instrumentalists
American music arrangers
American people of Indonesian descent
American people of Italian descent
Record producers from New York (state)
Ballad musicians
Donna Summer
American disco musicians
Musicians from Brooklyn
St. John's University (New York City) alumni
People from Flatbush, Brooklyn
Singer-songwriters from New York (state)